Llimiana is a village in the province of Lleida and autonomous community of Catalonia, Spain. The municipality includes a small exclave to the east.

References

External links
 Government data pages 

Municipalities in Pallars Jussà